In enzymology, a dTDP-4-amino-4,6-dideoxygalactose transaminase is an enzyme that catalyzes the chemical reaction

dTDP-4-amino-4,6-dideoxy-D-galactose + 2-oxoglutarate  dTDP-4-dehydro-6-deoxy-D-galactose + L-glutamate

Thus, the two substrates of this enzyme are dTDP-4-amino-4,6-dideoxy-D-galactose and 2-oxoglutarate, whereas its two products are dTDP-4-dehydro-6-deoxy-D-galactose and L-glutamate.

This enzyme belongs to the family of transferases, specifically the transaminases, which transfer nitrogenous groups.  The systematic name of this enzyme class is dTDP-4,6-dideoxy-D-galactose:2-oxoglutarate aminotransferase. Other names in common use include thymidine diphosphoaminodideoxygalactose aminotransferase, and thymidine diphosphate 4-keto-6-deoxy-D-glucose transaminase.  It employs one cofactor, pyridoxal phosphate.

References

 

EC 2.6.1
Pyridoxal phosphate enzymes
Enzymes of unknown structure